The zonetail butterfly ray (Gymnura zonura) is a species of fish in the family Gymnuridae. It is found in India, Indonesia, Singapore, and Thailand. Its natural habitats are open seas, shallow seas, subtidal aquatic beds, and estuarine waters.

References

Gymnuridae
Taxonomy articles created by Polbot
Fish described in 1852